Rubén Alcala (born 21 June 1953) is a Mexican basketball player. He competed in the men's tournament at the 1976 Summer Olympics.

References

External links

1953 births
Living people
Mexican men's basketball players
Olympic basketball players of Mexico
Basketball players at the 1976 Summer Olympics
Place of birth missing (living people)